The Saudi Second Division is the Third level football competition in Saudi Arabia. Qualified three teams to Saudi First Division.

Stadia and locations

Final league table

Third place match

Final

External links 
 Saudi Arabia Football Federation
 Saudi League Statistics
 goalzz

Saudi Second Division seasons
2010–11 in Saudi Arabian football